Colonel Hampden Clement Blamire Moody  (1821 – 27 February 1869) was the Commander of the Royal Engineers in China at the height of the British Empire and throughout the Second Opium War and the Taiping Rebellion.

Personal life
Hampden Clement Blamire Moody was born in 1821 on 10 January at Bedford Square, London. He was the eighth of ten children of Colonel Thomas Moody, Kt., who was a scion of a prominent British family, by Martha Clement (1784 - 1868), who was the daughter of the Dutch landowner Richard Clement (1754 - 1829). His mother was the sister of Hampden Clement [sic] (1808 – 1880) after whom she named Hampden Clement Blamire Moody, and through whom he was related to the cricketers Reynold Clement and Richard Clement. Hampden Clement Blamire Moody's siblings included Major Thomas Moody (1809 - 1839); and Major-General Richard Clement Moody, Knight Grand Cross of the Order of Military Merit of France (1813 - 1887), who was the founder and the first Lieutenant-Governor of British Columbia, and the first British Governor of the Falkland Islands; and The Rev. James Leith Moody (1816 -1896), who was Chaplain to Royal Navy in China and to the British Army in the Falkland Islands, and Gibraltar, and Malta, and Crimea.

Hampden Clement Blamire Moody's paternal grandmother was Barbara Blamire of the Blamire family of Cumberland and a cousin of the politician William Blamire MP and of the poet Susanna Blamire. Hampden Clement Blamire Moody was the uncle of Colonel Richard S. Hawks Moody (1854 - 1930), who was a distinguished British Army officer, and historian, and Military Knight of Windsor, and of Captain Henry de Clervaux Moody (b. 1864).

Hampden Clement Blamire Moody married Louise Harriet Thompson, who was the daughter of Samuel Thompson, at Belfast. Moody had two daughters: Sophia Louise (b. 14 October 1862) and Harriet Maud Maria (b. 12 February 1867); and had one son Hampden Lewis Clement (b. 28 February 1855, Hong Kong), who was a Captain of the Queen's Own Royal West Kent Regiment.

Career

Canada

Moody was commissioned in 1837, and promoted to Lieutenant in 1839, and served with the Royal Engineers in Canada from 1840 to 1848. He was based at Fort Garry, which was a trading post of the Hudson's Bay Company, of which he was a member, and for which, between 1844 and 1846, he performed confidential service, probably behind United States border.
In 1845, Moody assisted Edward Boxer and Lieutenant-General William Cuthbert Elphinstone Holloway to investigate Canada's defences and lines of communication against the United States. Moody the following year was promoted to captain and began two years of special service in Hudson Bay Territory, for which he and associated troops received "favorable notice" of the Secretary of State and Commander-in-Chief. Moody was a freemason of St. Paul's Lodge No. 12 (Ancient York Masons) in Montreal.

He was an accomplished artist: his typical paintings depict Canadian landscapes, and are in The National Archives of the United Kingdom, Public Archives of Canada, and Provincial Archives of Manitoba.

Kaffir War
Moody fought in the Kaffir War of 1851 to 1853, during which he received a medal and a notice, for gallant conduct on 13 June 1852, when he had led a detachment of Royal Engineers in Koonap Pass whilst significantly outnumbered. In 1852, he was Senior Royal Engineer on the Waterkloof and Transkei expeditions with Sir George Cathcart.

China
Moody was the Commander of the Royal Engineers across all of China during the Second Opium War (1856 – 1860) and, from April and May 1862, during the Taiping Rebellion, near Shanghai. The Royal Engineers were an elite military force who performed 'reconnaissance work, led storming parties, demolished obstacles in assaults, carried out rear-guard actions in retreats and other hazardous tasks'. 
During that time, Moody was promoted to Major in October 1858, and to Lieutenant-Colonel on 28 November 1859, and to Colonel in November 1864.

Belfast
Hampden Clement was serving as Commanding Royal Engineer at Belfast when he died on 27
February 1869, at 1 Lower Crescent. A memorial to him exists at Balmoral Cemetery, Belfast. He was invested as a Companion of the Order of the Bath.

References

Works cited

External links

1821 births
1869 deaths
Graduates of the Royal Military Academy, Woolwich
Royal Engineers officers
Military personnel from London
Colony of British Columbia (1858–1866) people
History of British Columbia
Canadian Freemasons
British Freemasons
Explorers of British Columbia
English explorers of North America
English surveyors
History of the Pacific Northwest
Hudson's Bay Company people
British colonial governors and administrators in the Americas
People from Bloomsbury
British Army personnel of the Second Opium War
British military personnel of the Taiping Rebellion